Simon Bowde (died 1595) of Norwich, Norfolk, was an English politician.

He was a Member of Parliament (MP) for Norwich in 1584 and mayor of the city in 1579–80.

References

Year of birth missing
1595 deaths
Politicians from Norwich
Mayors of Norwich
English MPs 1584–1585